20180206 Live at Budokan is the third live DVD by Japanese rock band Coldrain, released on September 26, 2018. The end credits of the DVD/Blu-ray is the song "My Addiction" from the first studio album Final Destination.

The entirety of Fateless is played in full with the exception of "Aftermath", which was not selected for unknown reasons. 

Due to the COVID-19 pandemic, Coldrain announced that they would showcase the entire performance on YouTube to help entertain everyone while in quarantine.

Track listing
"20180206 Live at Budokan" was released in CD, DVD and Blu-ray formats.

DVD and Blu-ray

CD 1

CD 2

Personnel
  – lead vocals
  – lead guitar, programming, keyboards
  – rhythm guitar, guitar, backing vocals
  – bass guitar, backing vocals
  – drums, percussion

Charts

References

Coldrain albums
2018 live albums
2018 video albums
Live video albums
Warner Music Group live albums
Warner Music Group video albums